The 2022 Wrestling World Cup - Men's Greco-Roman was held in Baku, Azerbaijan at the Baku Sports Palace On 5 to November 6, 2022.

The Greco-Roman World Cup has featured an All-World team for the first time ever. Serbia forfeited the tournament after a number of COVID-19 infections in the team. Azerbaijan and the All-World team will receive automatic wins.

Pool stage

Pool A

Pool B

Medal Matches

Final ranking

See also
2022 Wrestling World Cup - Men's freestyle
2022 Wrestling World Cup - Women's freestyle

References

External links
 Results Book
 Official website

Wrestling World Cup
Greco-Roman wrestling
Wrestling World Cup
Wrestling World Cup
Wrestling World Cup
Sports competitions in Azerbaijan
Sports competitions in Baku
Wrestling World Cup